Tanko Dyakov (born 18 August 1984) is a former Bulgarian footballer who played as a defender.

Career

Early career
Born in Stara Zagora, Dyakov started his career at Beroe, a club from his hometown, for which he made 16 appearances, scoring one goal, but lack of first team opportunities prompted a move to Levski Hyunday in July 2003. Year later he was transferred to Minyor Radnevo. After a good season at Minyor, Dyakov was scouted by Slavia Sofia.

Slavia
In June 2005 Dyakov signed a contract at Slavia until 30 June 2008. He made his debut in A PFG during the 2005–06 season on 7 August 2005 in a 2–0 home win against Pirin Blagoevgrad, coming on as a substitute for Blagoy Georgiev. In this season, Tanko earned 16 appearances in the A PFG.

After the end of the season the new Slavia coach Ratko Dostanić informed him that he would not be a first-team regular from then on with this resulting in his pushing for a move to another club.

In July 2006, Dyakov was signed by his previously club AKB Minyor Radnevo for an undisclosed fee. He marked his re-debut for Minyor with goal in a 2–4 away loss against Shumen.

Vihren
In January 2007, Dyakov signed a two-a-half-year deal with Vihren Sandanski. He made his debut on 3 March 2007, playing 90 minutes of a 0–1 away loss against Lokomotiv Sofia and scored his first goal for the team as they beat Marek Dupnitsa 1–0 on 21 March. On 27 May Tanko scored twice for a 2–0 home win against his first club Beroe.

On 15 September 2007, Dyakov scored his first goal of the 2007–08 season against Vidima-Rakovski. On 10 November, Tanko hit his second goal of the campaign. This time he scored the first Vihren goal in the 3–1 win against Marek Dupnitsa. On 19 April 2008, Dyakov scored his last goal for Vihren against Lokomotiv Plovdiv.

After a good season at Vihren, he was wanted by Cherno More Varna and Greek Aris Thessaloniki. On 1 June 2008 it was announced that Dyakov will be joining Cherno More.

Cherno More
On 3 June 2008, Dyakov signed a 3 years contract with Cherno More for a transfer fee of €60,000. He took over the number 6 jersey. Tanko made his debut for the Sailors on 17 July 2008 against UE Sant Julià of the UEFA Cup, coming on as a substitute for Nikolay Domakinov. He made his A PFG debut during the 2008–09 season on 17 August 2010 in a 2–0 home win against Vihren Sandanski. On 18 September 2008, Dyakov scored his first goal (with a powerful header) against VfB Stuttgart in the first round of the UEFA Cup, but Cherno More were eventually eliminated after an aggregate score of 3:4.

In January 2011, Dyakov underwent an unsuccessful trial with Russian club Krasnodar.

Lokomotiv Sofia
On 22 June 2011, Dyakov signed a 2 years contract with Lokomotiv Sofia after his contract expired. Tanko expressed his decision to play for Lokomotiv because this is one of the best Bulgarian teams and is a great opportunity to play in Europa League.

Lokomotiv Plovdiv
After that Dyakov had a short stint with Loko Plovdiv.

Zhetysu
In July 2012, Dyakov signed with Zhetysu in the Kazakhstan Premier League until the end of the year, as he had failed to agree further terms with Loko Plovdiv.

Lyubimets
In late August 2013, Dyakov put pen to paper on a short-term contract with newly promoted A PFG club Lyubimets 2007.

Beroe
In the summer of 2014, after six months without a club, Dyakov joined Beroe.

Club statistics
As of 30 May 2012

References

1984 births
Living people
Bulgarian footballers
First Professional Football League (Bulgaria) players
Association football defenders
PFC Beroe Stara Zagora players
PFC Slavia Sofia players
OFC Vihren Sandanski players
PFC Cherno More Varna players
FC Lokomotiv 1929 Sofia players
PFC Lokomotiv Plovdiv players
FC Lyubimets players
Sportspeople from Stara Zagora